The Bombay Presidency Hard Court Championships  was an international combined men's and women's tennis clay court tournament founded in 1924. The championships were played at the Hindu Gymkhana, Bombay, India. The championships ran until 1950 before they was discontinued.

History
Tennis was introduced to India in 1880s by British Army and Civilian Officers. In 1924 The Bombay Presidency Hard Court Championships were established in Bombay, India and played on clay courts at the Hindu Gymkhanaa. After World War two it decreased in popularity and was discontinued.

Finals

Men's singles
Incomplete roll

Women's singles
Incomplete roll

References

Defunct tennis tournaments in India
Clay court tennis tournaments